The Fabian strategy is a military strategy where pitched battles and frontal assaults are avoided in favor of wearing down an opponent through a war of attrition and indirection. While avoiding decisive battles, the side employing this strategy harasses its enemy through skirmishes to cause attrition, disrupt supply and affect morale. Employment of this strategy implies that the side adopting this strategy believes time is on its side, usually because the side employing the strategy is fighting in, or close to, their homeland and the enemy is far from home and by necessity has long and costly supply lines. It may also be adopted when no feasible alternative strategy can be devised.

Rome versus Carthage: The Second Punic War 

This strategy derives its name from Quintus Fabius Maximus Verrucosus, the dictator of the Roman Republic given the task of defeating the great Carthaginian general Hannibal in southern Italy during the Second Punic War (218–201 BC). At the start of the war, Hannibal boldly crossed the Alps and invaded Italy. Due to his skill as a general, Hannibal repeatedly inflicted devastating losses on the Romans—quickly achieving two crushing victories over Roman armies at Trebia and Lake Trasimene, followed by another at Cannae. After these disasters, the Romans gave full authority to Fabius Maximus as dictator. Fabius initiated a war of attrition, fought through constant skirmishes, limiting the ability of the Carthaginians to forage for food and denying them significant victories.

Hannibal was handicapped by two weaknesses. First, he was commander of an invading foreign army (on Italian soil), and was effectively cut off from his home country by difficulty of seaborne resupply. As long as Rome's allies remained loyal, there was little he could do to win. Hannibal tried to convince the allies of Rome that it was more beneficial for them to side with Carthage (through a combination of victory and negotiation). Fabius calculated that, in order to defeat Hannibal, he had to avoid engaging him altogether (so as to deprive him of victories). He determined that Hannibal's largely extended supply lines (as well as the cost of maintaining the Carthaginian army in the field) meant that Rome had time on its side.

Fabius avoided battle as a deliberate strategy. He sent out small military units to attack Hannibal's foraging parties while keeping the Roman army in hilly terrain to nullify Carthaginian cavalry superiority. Residents of small villages in the path of the Carthaginians were ordered by Fabius to burn their crops and take refuge in fortified towns. Fabius used interior lines to ensure that Hannibal could not march directly on Rome without having to first abandon his Mediterranean ports (supply lines). At the same time, Fabius began to inflict constant, small, debilitating defeats on the North Africans. This, Fabius had concluded, would wear down the invaders' endurance and discourage Rome's allies from switching sides, without challenging the Carthaginians to major battles. Once the Carthaginians were sufficiently weakened and demoralized by lack of food and supplies, Fabius and his well-fed legions would then fight a decisive battle in the hope of crushing the Carthaginians once and for all.

Hannibal's second weakness was much of his army being made up of Spanish mercenaries and Gaulish allies. Their loyalty to Hannibal was shallow; though they disliked Rome, they mainly desired quick battles and raids for plunder. They were unsuited for long sieges, and possessed neither the equipment nor the patience for such tactics. The tedium of countless small-skirmish defeats sapped their morale, and they began to desert.

With no main Roman army to attack, Hannibal's army became virtually no threat to Rome, which was a walled city that required a long siege to take. Fabius's strategy struck at the heart of Hannibal's weakness. Time, not major battles, would cripple Hannibal.

Political opposition 
Fabius's strategy, though a military success and tolerable to wiser minds in the Roman Senate, was unpopular; the Romans had been long accustomed to facing and besting their enemies directly on the field of battle. The Fabian strategy was, in part, ruined because of a lack of unity in the command of the Roman army. The magister equitum, Marcus Minucius Rufus, a political enemy of Fabius, famously exclaiming:
Are we come here to see our allies butchered, and their property burned, as a spectacle to be enjoyed? And if we are not moved with shame on account of any others, are we not on account of these citizens... which now not the neighboring Samnite wastes with fire, but a Carthaginian foreigner, who has advanced even this far from the remotest limits of the world, through our dilatoriness and inactivity?

As the memory of the shock of Hannibal's victories grew dimmer, the Roman populace gradually started to question the wisdom of the Fabian strategy, the very thing which had given them time to recover. It was especially frustrating to the mass of the people, who were eager to see a quick conclusion to the war. Moreover, it was widely believed that if Hannibal continued plundering Italy unopposed, the allies, believing that Rome was incapable of protecting them, might defect to the Carthaginians.

Since Fabius won no large-scale victories, the Senate removed him from command. Their chosen replacement, Gaius Terentius Varro, led the Roman army into a debacle at the Battle of Cannae. The Romans, after experiencing this catastrophic defeat and losing countless other battles, had by this point learned their lesson. They utilized the strategies that Fabius had taught them, which, they finally realized, were the only feasible means of driving Hannibal from Italy.

This strategy of attrition earned Fabius the cognomen "Cunctator" (The Delayer).

Later examples 

During the Roman campaign against Persia prosecuted by Julian in 363 AD, the main Persian army under Shapur II let the numerically superior Romans advance deep into their territory, avoiding a full-scale battle at the expense of the destruction of their fortresses. As the fortified Persian capital seemed impregnable, they were lured into Persia's interior, where the Persians employed scorched earth tactics. Shapur II's army appeared later and engaged in continuous skirmishes only after the starving Romans were in retreat, resulting in a disastrous Roman defeat.

The strategy was used by the medieval French general Bertrand du Guesclin during the Hundred Years' War against the English following a series of disastrous defeats in pitched battles against Edward, the Black Prince. Eventually du Guesclin was able to recover most of the territory that had been lost.

The most noted use of Fabian strategy in American history was by George Washington, sometimes called the "American Fabius" for his use of the strategy during the first year of the American Revolutionary War. While Washington had initially pushed for traditional direct engagements using battle lines, he was convinced of the merits of using his army to harass the British rather than engage them, both by the urging of his generals in his councils of war, and by the pitched-battle disasters of 1776, especially the Battle of Long Island. In addition, given his background as a colonial officer who had participated in asymmetric campaigns against Native Americans, Washington predicted that this style would aid in defeating the traditional tactics of the British Army.

During the American Revolution, John Adams' dissatisfaction with Washington's conduct of the war led him to declare, "I am sick of Fabian systems in all quarters."

Throughout history, the Fabian strategy has been employed all over the world. Used against Napoleon's Grande Armée, it proved decisive in defeating the French invasion of Russia. Sam Houston effectively employed a Fabian defense in the aftermath of the Battle of the Alamo, using delaying tactics and small-unit harrying against Santa Anna's much larger force, to give time for the Army of Texas to grow into a viable fighting force. When he finally met Santa Anna at San Jacinto, the resulting victory ensured the establishment of the Republic of Texas. During the First World War in German East Africa, Generals Paul von Lettow-Vorbeck and Jan Smuts both used the Fabian strategy in their campaigns.

During the First Indochina War, the Viet Minh used the strategy by utilizing delaying and hit-and-run tactics and scorched-earth strategy against the better-equipped French forces, which prolonged the war and caused both the French high command and home front to grow weary of the fighting, ending with the decisive Vietnamese victory at Dien Bien Phu.

Fabian socialism 
Fabian socialism, the ideology of the Fabian Society (founded in 1884), significantly influenced the Labour Party in the United Kingdom. It utilizes the same strategy of a "war of attrition" to facilitate the society's aim to bring about a socialist state. The advocation of gradualism distinguished this brand of socialism from those who favor revolutionary action.

See also 
 Attrition warfare
 Battle of annihilation
 Fleet in being
 Guerrilla warfare
 U.S. Army Strategist

References 

 Liddell Hart, B. H. Strategy. London: Faber & Faber, 1967 (2nd rev. ed.)

Military strategy